The 2001 ICF Canoe Sprint World Championships were held in Poznań, Poland at Lake Malta. The Polish city had hosted the event previously in 1990.

The men's competition consisted of nine Canadian (single paddle, open boat) and nine kayak events. Women competed in nine events, all kayak. The women's K-4 1000 m event was added at these championships, the last change to the program until a new program was approved for the 2009 event at the 2008 ICF Congress in Rome.

This was the 31st championships in canoe sprint.

Medal summary

Men's
 Non-Olympic classes

Canoe

Kayak

Women's
 Non-Olympic classes

Kayak

Medal table

References
ICF 2008 Congress report from Rome. – accessed November 30, 2008.
ICF medalists for Olympic and World Championships - Part 1: flatwater (now sprint): 1936-2007.
ICF medalists for Olympic and World Championships - Part 2: rest of flatwater (now sprint) and remaining canoeing disciplines: 1936-2007.

Icf Canoe Sprint World Championships, 2001
Icf Canoe Sprint World Championships, 2001
ICF Canoe Sprint World Championships
Canoeing
Sport in Poznań
21st century in Poznań
Canoeing and kayaking competitions in Poland